The Black Widow Pulsar (PSR B1957+20) is an eclipsing binary millisecond pulsar in the Milky Way. It orbits with a brown dwarf or Super-Jupiter companion with a period of 9.2 hours with an eclipse duration of approximately 20 minutes. When it was discovered, it was the first such pulsar known. The prevailing theoretical explanation for the system implied that the companion is being destroyed by the strong powerful outflows, or winds, of high-energy particles caused by the neutron star; thus, the sobriquet black widow was applied to the object. Subsequent to this, other objects with similar features have been discovered, and the name has been applied to the class of millisecond pulsars with an ablating companion, as of February 2023 around 41 black windows are know to exist.

Later observations of the object showed a bow shock in H-alpha and a smaller-in-extent shock seen in X-rays (as observed by the Chandra X-ray Observatory), indicating a forward velocity of approximately a million kilometers per hour.

In January 2023 the upper limit was revised down to

Planets 
The pulsar has a substellar companion, possibly a brown dwarf.

Gallery
Artist impressions of the Black Widow Pulsar.

See also 

 PSR J1544+4937
PSR J1719-1438

References

Sagitta (constellation)
X-ray binaries
Eclipsing binaries
Millisecond pulsars
Sagittae, QX
Astronomical objects discovered in 1988